Oriens goloides, the Ceylon dartlet or smaller dartlet, is a butterfly belonging to the family Hesperiidae found in India and Sri Lanka and Malay Peninsula.

Description

"Nearest allied species is Oriens gola. Differs from it on both sides in the narrower discal band of the forewing, the band being also disconnected from the costal spots; the band of the hindwing is also narrower." (Frederic Moore)

The larvae are known to feed on Axonopus compressus and Oplismenus compositus.

References

Taractrocerini
Butterflies of Asia
Butterflies of Indochina
Butterflies described in 1881